Leaf plate montipora (Montipora capricornis), also known as vase coral, cap coral, or plating montipora, is a type of small polyp stony (SPS) coral in the family Acroporidae.

Description

Montipora capricornis forms flat, plating colonies. The colonies expand by adding to their foundations and further spreading out. The individual polyps appear as small "bumps" on the surface of the skeleton. At night, the polyps emerge from the skeleton to feed on plankton. The polyps are usually transparent with slight patches of color due to zooxanthellae, symbiotic algae living in the coral's tissue.

Habitat
Montipora capricornis is a very common species of coral, particularly in the Indian and Pacific oceans, as well as in reefs in the Red Sea. It usually inhabits the top half of the reef where photosynthesis can occur. Montipora capricornis will "branch out" from their foundation into an area with adequate sunlight. It also lives in coral reefs and enjoys warm sunny temperatures.

Aquarium trade
Montipora capricornis is one of the more common species of SPS coral available on the market. It comes in various color variations, including red, green, and orange. It is considered to be a good beginner's SPS coral, because it is much more tolerant of under-ideal conditions than its relative, Acropora. Montipora capricornis prefers to live in a reef aquarium, if brought into captivity. This Montipora coral prefers a water temperature of a stable . It prefers strong lighting such as that provided by metal halides, but even a modest compact fluorescent lighting system st gn gn

References

External links

ReefCorner - Montipora capricornis Database Entry

Acroporidae
Coral reefs
Cnidarians of the Pacific Ocean
Cnidarians of the Indian Ocean
Fauna of the Red Sea
Marine fauna of Asia
Marine fauna of Oceania
Marine fauna of Southeast Asia
Marine fauna of Western Asia
Cnidarians of Australia
Fauna of Western Australia
Animals described in 1985